{{Taxobox
| name = Can. Brocadia fulgida| regnum = Bacteria
| phylum = Planctomycetota| classis = "Ca. Brocadiae"
| ordo = "Ca. Brocadiales"
| familia = "Ca. Brocadiaceae"
| genus = "Ca. Brocadia"
| species = "Ca. B. fulgida"
| binomial = "Candidatus Brocadia fulgida"
| binomial_authority = Kartal et al. 2004
}}'Candidatus Brocadia fulgida' is a bacterial species that performs the anammox process. Fatty acids constitute an enrichment culture for B. fulgida''. The species' 16S ribosomal RNA sequence has been determined. During the anammox process, it oxidizes acetate at the highest rate and outcompetes other anammox bacteria, which indicates that it does not incorporate acetate directly into its biomass like other anammox bacteria.

References

Environmental microbiology
Planctomycetota
Bacteria described in 2004
Candidatus taxa